The 2015 Algerian Super Cup was the  9th edition of Algerian Super Cup, a football match contested by the winners of the 2014–15 Algerian Ligue Professionnelle 1 and 2014–15 Algerian Cup competitions. The match was played on November 1, 2015 at Stade Mohamed Hamlaoui in Constantine between 2014-15 Ligue 1 winners ES Sétif and 2014–15 Algerian Cup winners MO Béjaïa. ES Sétif won the match 1–0 with a lone goal in the 84th minute by El Hedi Belameiri.

Match details

References 

2015
ES Sétif matches
Supercup